The 2000 United States Senate election in Minnesota was held on November 7, 2000 to select the U.S. Senator from the state of Minnesota. The race pitted incumbent Republican Senator Rod Grams against former Minnesota State Auditor Mark Dayton. Dayton won with 48.83% of the vote against Grams' 43.29%. Dayton declined to run for reelection in 2006.

DFL primary 
Mark Dayton, former Minnesota State Auditor
Michael V. Ciresi, attorney
Jerry Janezich, state senator
Rebecca Yanisch
Richard "Dick" Franson, city councilman
Oloveuse S. "Ole" Savior, artist and perennial candidate.
Gregg A. Iverson

Results

Republican primary

Candidate 
Rod Grams, incumbent U.S. Senator
William Paul "Bill" Dahn

Results

General election

Candidates 
 Mark Dayton (DFL), former State Auditor and former candidate for this seat in 1982
 Rod Grams (R), incumbent U.S. Senator

Debates 
Dayton and Grams had three debates. One on October 18, one on October 26, and one on November 3.

Results

See also 
 2000 United States Senate elections

References 

2000 Minnesota elections
Minnesota
2000